N. K. Ekhambram is an Indian cinematographer who works in Tamil, Malayalam, Telugu and Hindi film industries.  He studied Film and Television Institute of Tamil Nadu. He worked as an assistant cinematographer to Jeeva.

Filmography

References

Living people
Year of birth missing (living people)
Cinematographers from Tamil Nadu
M.G.R. Government Film and Television Training Institute alumni
People from Tiruvarur district
Tamil film cinematographers
Malayalam film cinematographers
Hindi film cinematographers
Telugu film cinematographers